"Touch the Hand" is a song co-written and recorded by American country music singer Conway Twitty.  It was released in August 1975 as the first single from the album The High Priest of Country Music.  A ballad that became one of his 41 Billboard magazine No. 1 songs (all but one of them on the Hot Country Singles charts), the song represented one half of a double-sided hit for Twitty in 1975.  The other side was "Don't Cry Joni."

Initially, Twitty claimed to have written Touch the Hand. But after Ron Peterson (twice president of the Nashville Songwriters Association) filed a copyright infringement suit against the singer in Nashville on September 23, 1975, Peterson was properly credited.

Personnel
Conway Twitty — vocals
Harold Bradley — 6-string electric bass guitar
Ray Edenton — acoustic guitar
Johnny Gimble — fiddle
John Hughey — steel guitar
Tommy Markham — drums
Grady Martin — electric guitar
Bob Moore — bass
Hargus "Pig" Robbins — piano

Chart performance

See also
[ Allmusic — Don't Cry Joni] and [ Touch the Hand by Conway Twitty].

References

1975 singles
1975 songs
Conway Twitty songs
Songs written by Conway Twitty
Song recordings produced by Owen Bradley
MCA Records singles